The 2020–21 CEV Challenge Cup was the 41st edition of the CEV Challenge Cup tournament. 33 teams from 22 countries were participating in the competition.

Participating teams

Format 
Qualification Phase (Knock-out with Home and Away Matches):
1st Round (if needed) → 2nd Round

Main Phase (Knock-out with Home and Away Matches):
1/16 Finals → 1/8 Finals→1/4 Finals

Final Phase (Knock-out with Home and Away Matches):
Semi-Finals → Final

Aggregate score is counted as follows: 3 points for 3–0 or 3–1 wins, 2 points for 3–2 win, 1 point for 2–3 loss. In case the teams are tied after two legs, a Golden Set is played immediately at the completion of the second leg.

Qualification phase

2nd round

|}

First leg

|}

Second leg

|}

Main phase

16th finals

|}

First leg

|}

Second leg

|}

8th finals

|}

Group A
 Place:  Ankara

|}

Group B
 Place:  Milan

|}

Group C
 Place:  Horodok

|}

4th finals

|}

Group A
 Place:  Ankara

|}

Group B
 Place:  Milan

|}

Group C
 Place:  Horodok

|}

Final phase

Semifinals

|}

First leg

|}

Second leg

|}

Finals

|}

First leg

|}

Second leg

|}

Final standing

References

External links
 Official site 

CEV Challenge Cup
CEV Challenge Cup
CEV Challenge Cup
Sports events affected by the COVID-19 pandemic